KITX (95.5 FM) is a radio station broadcasting a country music format. Licensed to Hugo, Oklahoma, United States, the station serves the Paris, TX area. (#1 since 2000) The station is currently owned by Payne Media Group LLC and features programming from Fox News, Premiere Radio Networks .

Current Program Schedule:
 
 5–9:15am - "The WB Morning Circus" with Will Payne & Barry Diamond
 9:15am – 3pm - Julie Stevens
 3–7pm - Barry Diamond
 7pm-Midnight - "The Night Show with Shawn Pharr"

History
The very first FM station in the Paris, TX area. The station was assigned the call sign KITX on February 7, 1983. In 2017 KITX became the very first HD station in Paris, TX enabling HD-2, HD-3, and HD-4 channels HD-2 Active Rock KMMY, HD-3 Classic Country, and HD-4 ESPN Radio 105.1. #1 in Lamar County, Choctaw County, and Pushmataha County since 2000.

Translators

References

External links
http://www.k955.com

ITX
Country radio stations in the United States
Radio stations established in 1983